Sandra Louise Vogelgesang (born 1942) was a senior foreign service officer and policy planner for the U.S. State Department.

Life
She attended Cornell University and Fletcher School of Law and Diplomacy at Tufts University.  
She served as a deputy assistant Secretary of State, and, from 1994 to 1997 she was U.S. Ambassador to Nepal, appointed by President Bill Clinton.

She is married to Geoffrey Wolfe.

Writings
 American Dream, Global Nightmare: The Dilemma of U.S. Human Rights Policy, Norton, 1980, 272 pp,  
 Long Dark Night of the Soul: The American Intellectual Left and the Vietnam War, Harper Collins, 1974, 249 pp,

References
Political Graveyard

1942 births
Living people
American political writers
People from Franklin County, Ohio
Ambassadors of the United States to Nepal
Cornell University alumni
The Fletcher School at Tufts University alumni
American women ambassadors
United States Foreign Service personnel
20th-century American diplomats
20th-century American women
21st-century American women